A unit cube, more formally a cube of side 1, is a cube whose sides are 1 unit long. The volume of a 3-dimensional unit cube is 1 cubic unit, and its total surface area is 6 square units.

Unit hypercube 
The term unit cube or unit hypercube is also used for hypercubes, or "cubes" in n-dimensional spaces, for values of n other than 3 and edge length 1.

Sometimes the term "unit cube" refers in specific to the set [0, 1]n of all n-tuples of numbers in the interval [0, 1].

See also 
Doubling the cube
K-cell
Robbins constant, the average distance between two random points in a unit cube
Tychonoff cube, an infinite-dimensional analogue of the unit cube
Unit square
Unit sphere

References

External links 
 

Euclidean solid geometry
1 (number)
Cubes